Bahram is an Iranian hero in Shahnameh, the national epic of Greater Iran. He is son of Goudarz and brother of Rohham, Giv and Hojir. In the story of Siavash, he and Zange-ye Shavaran are Siavash's counselors. They unsuccessfully try to convince Siavash not to go to Turan. When Siavash goes to Turan and abandons Iranian army, Bahram is put in command of the Iranian army until the arrival of Tous. His most important adventure is in the story of Farud, where he fights with Turanian army along with other Iranian heroes . When Iranian army is marching toward Turan, they encounter Farud, who along with Tokhar (تُخوار) are standing on a mountain. Tous, the spahbed of Iranian army does not know Farud and think that he is a Turanian foe. He sends Bahram to go there and kill both of them. When Bahram arrives at Farud, Farud introduces himself and says that he is son of Siavash and want to avenge Afriasiab. Bahram comes back to Tous and tells him that they are not enemy and instead they want to join Iranian army to fight against Afrasiab. Tous, however, does not believe this and orders to kill Farud. Bahram unsuccessfully tries to restrain Tous and Iranians from killing Farud and his companion. However, Farud was eventually slain by Rohham and Bizhan.

Bahram, seeing himself as somehow to blame for Ferud's death, he no longer cares for his own life. In a subsequent war between Iran and Turan shortly after Farud's death, he lost his whip in the battlefield. Although Goudarz, his father, and Giv, his brother advice him to not go for the whip, he sees this incident as a bad omen and puts his life to danger and returns to the battlefield solely in search of his whip. He finds an injured Iranian soldier and binds his wounds. He finally finds his whip, but at the last minute, he was surrounded by Turanian men. He bravely fights with them but at last, he was severely injured by Tazhāv (تَژاو) and shortly after he dies of the wound. The unknown author of Mojmal al-tavarikh mentions him as the master of ceremonies (amīr-e majles) in Kay Khosrow's reign.

Family tree

References 

Shahnameh characters